Power Drive' is an arcade racing game featuring monster trucks from 1987 by Bally Midway. This arcade game is for up to three players simultaneously. Game modes include speed rallies, car crushes, high jumps and sled pulls.

References 

1987 video games
Arcade video games
Arcade-only video games
Racing video games
Video games developed in the United States